Munnawar Khan (d. 1671) was a Mughal Empire admiral during the reign of Emperor Aurangzeb.

Biography
Khan was born to a Muslim family in the city of Agra. He entered service during the rule of Mughal Emperor Aurangzeb, during the conquest of Golconda, he first started his naval training by protecting Mughal supply routes in narrow and difficult rivers, he was also promoted as the chief admiral in the Bay of Bengal, he visited Janjira on several occasions. Munnawar Khan was sent on a campaign in the Brahmaputra River against the Ahoms in Assam along with the talented Muhammad Saleh Kamboh, they built trade cog sized Dhows some with artillery, archers and musketeers under five Sardars (admirals), during the Battle of Saraighat. But the Mughal fleet was outnumbered by 3300 Ahom war-canoes. Munnawar Khan was killed by a deadly arrow which struck his backbone, throwing the Mughals out of gear. They suffered the loss of three top-ranking Amirs, and another 4000 dead on that fatal day in 1671.

However, Mughal Admiral Muhammad Saleh Kamboh survived and wrote an account on that tragic encounter against the Ahoms, he noted:

Although much weaker, the Ahom army defeated the Mughal army by brilliant uses of the terrain, clever diplomatic negotiations to buy time, guerrilla tactics, psychological warfare, military intelligence and by exploiting the sole weakness of the Mughal forces—its navy.

See also
Mughal weapons
Aurangzeb
Mir Jumla II

Mughal Empire
1671 deaths
Male sailors
Year of birth unknown
History of Assam